Greg Foe (born 17 December 1991) is a Samoan international rugby union player who currently plays as a flanker for  in New Zealand's domestic Mitre 10 Cup.

Senior career

International

Born in Samoa, but raised in New Zealand, Foe has represented the land of his birth at numerous levels including; under 20, sevens and Samoa A.

He first made the Samoa senior national team in 2016, debuting in the number 7 jersey in a 26–16 defeat against  in Suva.

References

1991 births
Living people
Samoan rugby union players
Samoa international rugby union players
Rugby union flankers
Wellington rugby union players
Samoan emigrants to New Zealand
Male rugby sevens players
People educated at Papatoetoe High School